MKS Kalisz, known as Energa MKS Kalisz for sponsorship reasons, is a men's handball club from Kalisz, Poland, that plays in the Superliga.

History 
Historical names:
Szczypiorno Kalisz (2007–2015)
MKS Kalisz (2015–2018)
Energa MKS Kalisz (2018–)

Team

Current squad
Squad for the 2022–23 season

Goalkeepers
 12  Krzysztof Szczecina
 96  Jan Hrdlička

Left wingers
 28  Łukasz Kużdeba
 35  Miłosz Bekisz
Right wingers
 13  Michał Drej
 17  Mateusz Góralski
Line players
3  Piotr Krępa
 11  Mateusz Kus
 14  Kamil Pedryc
 48  Wiktor Karpiński

Left backs
9  Jędrzej Zieniewicz
 15  Patryk Biernacki
Centre backs
 23  Konrad Pilitowski
 24  Maciej Pilitowski
Right backs
 19  Gracjan Wróbel
 44  Kamil Adamczyk

Transfers
Transfers for the 2022–23 season

 Joining
  Jan Hrdlička (GK) (from  HK Lovosice)
  Krzysztof Szczecina (GK) (from  MMTS Kwidzyn)
  Łukasz Kużdeba (LW) (from  Grupa Azoty Unia Tarnów)
  Patryk Biernacki (LB) (from  TSV Bayer Dormagen)
  Jędrzej Zieniewicz (LB) (from  MMTS Kwidzyn)
  Kamil Adamczyk (RB) (from  Sarrebourg MHB)
  Wiktor Karpiński (P) (from  SMS Płock)

 Leaving
  Mikołaj Krekora (GK) (to  ARGED KPR Ostrovia)
  Łukasz Zakreta (GK) (to  MMTS Kwidzyn)
  Bartłomiej Tomczak (LW) (to  ARGED KPR Ostrovia)
  Kacper Adamski (LB) (to  Azoty Puławy)
  Robert Kamyszek (LB) (to  MMTS Kwidzyn)
  Stanisław Makowiejew (CB) (to  ORLEN Upstream SRS Przemyśl)
  Marek Szpera (RB) (to  ARGED KPR Ostrovia)

References

External links
  

Polish handball clubs
Sport in Greater Poland Voivodeship
Handball clubs established in 2007
2007 establishments in Poland
Kalisz